Chain Valley Bay is a suburb of the Central Coast region of New South Wales, Australia. It is part of the  local government area.

Chain Valley Bay has a shopping area containing a general store/liquor shop, take away shop and a hairdresser salon.

References

Places

Chain Valley Bay is located on the South East end of Lake Macqurie. There is now a Woolworths near Chain Valley Bay located in Lake Munmorah.

Highways

Highways around Chain Valley Bay are the A43 Pacific Highway and the M1 Motorway that connects Sydney and Newcastle.

Suburbs of the Central Coast (New South Wales)
Bays of New South Wales